Lequio Tanaro is a comune (municipality) in the Province of Cuneo in the Italian region Piedmont, located about  south of Turin and about  northeast of Cuneo.

Lequio Tanaro borders the following municipalities: Bene Vagienna, Dogliani, Farigliano, Monchiero, Narzole, Novello, and Piozzo.

Demographic evolution

References

Cities and towns in Piedmont

lmo:Lequi